George James Dickie (22 September 1903 – 1960) was a Scottish footballer who played in the English Football League for Bristol City, Chester, New Brighton, Preston North End and Stoke City.

Career
Dickie was born in Montrose and played for Buckie Thistle where he had an unsuccessful trial at Preston North End in 1923 before joining Stoke City in 1925. He played once for Stoke before signing for Preston and then returned to Scotland with Forres Mechanics and then St Johnstone. He them made a more successful spell in English football playing two seasons for New Brighton and Bristol City. Dickie then went on to play for Chester, Macclesfield and made a return to New Brighton.

Career statistics
Source:

References

Scottish footballers
Bristol City F.C. players
Chester City F.C. players
New Brighton A.F.C. players
Preston North End F.C. players
Stoke City F.C. players
English Football League players
1903 births
1960 deaths
People from Montrose, Angus
St Johnstone F.C. players
Buckie Thistle F.C. players
Association football wingers
Scottish Football League players
Highland Football League players
Forres Mechanics F.C. players
Footballers from Angus, Scotland